The 1962 Arizona Wildcats football team represented the University of Arizona in the Western Athletic Conference (WAC) during the 1962 NCAA University Division football season.  In their fourth season under head coach Jim LaRue, the Wildcats compiled a 5–5 record (2–2 against WAC opponents), finished in a tie for third place in the WAC, and were outscored by their opponents, 171 to 134.  The team captains were Ken Cook and Howard Breinig. The team played its home games in Arizona Stadium in Tucson, Arizona.

The team's statistical leaders included Bill Brechler with 261 passing yards, Tom Kosser with 415 rushing yards, and Ken Cook with 187 receiving yards.

Schedule

References

Arizona
Arizona Wildcats football seasons
Arizona Wildcats football